The twenty-first season of the American competitive reality television series Hell's Kitchen (subtitled as Hell's Kitchen: Battle of the Ages) premiered on Fox on September 29, 2022, and concluded on February 9, 2023. Gordon Ramsay returned as host and head chef, while season ten winner Christina Wilson returned to serve as red team sous-chef and season seven runner-up Jason Santos returned to serve as blue team sous-chef.

The season was won by former restaurant owner Alex Belew, with executive chef Dafne Mejia finishing second and head chef Alejandro Najar placing third.

Production
On February 1, 2022, it was announced that the series had been renewed for a twenty-first and twenty-second season. Filming for this season began in January 2022, making this the first Hell's Kitchen season filmed following the start of the COVID-19 pandemic. On June 6, 2022, it was announced that the twenty-first season would premiere on September 29, 2022.

Chefs
Eighteen chefs competed in season 21. For the third time in the show's history (following seasons one and 18), the chefs were not divided by gender at the start of the season. Instead, they were divided by age, with the "20-somethings" on the red team and the "40-somethings" on the blue team. Starting from the end of the third episode, the teams were divided by gender, with women on the red team and men on the blue team.

"20-Somethings"

"40-Somethings"

Contestant progress

Episodes

References 

2022 American television seasons
Hell's Kitchen (American TV series)